Eunoe hozawai is a scale worm described from Japan, North Pacific Ocean.

description
Number of segments 40; elytra 15 pairs. Anterior margin of prostomium rounded. Lateral antennae inserted ventrally (beneath prostomium and median antenna). Notochaetae about as thick as neurochaetae. Bidentate neurochaetae absent.

References

Phyllodocida
Animals described in 1939